Delopterus is a monotypic snout moth genus (family Pyralidae). Its single species, Delopterus basalis, is found in Namibia, South Africa and Zimbabwe. Both the genus and species were first described by Anthonie Johannes Theodorus Janse in 1922.

References

Lepidoptera of Namibia
Lepidoptera of South Africa
Lepidoptera of Zimbabwe
Moths of Sub-Saharan Africa
Monotypic moth genera
Pyralinae
Pyralidae genera